Wayland High School is the public high school for the town of Wayland, Massachusetts, United States. During the 2021–2022 school year, there were 831 students enrolled at the high school. Wayland High School is consistently ranked as one of the best schools in the Boston area. In 2022 Boston Magazine ranked WHS as #5 on their list of "Best Public High Schools in Boston".

History

Early history (1854–1951) 
The first public high school in Wayland was opened in the 1854–1855 school year at 55 Cochituate Road. However, "Classes were suspended in 1859 and again in 1862 because the town was unwilling to vote funds to support a high school."

In 1873 the consolidated Cochituate School was opened to house both older and younger students, but in 1896, due to crowding and rundown buildings, The Center School was built. The school "welcomed students in grades 1 to 12 in 1897. It served as a high school until 1936, and as a junior high school until 1961."

In the 1930s, again due to overcrowding, a new building (now the Wayland Town Building) was constructed behind the Trinitarian Church using federal grant money from the National Industrial Recovery Act of 1933. "[T]he final construction was for a four-classroom building with no basement due to the high water table, all to accommodate 250 students. The plans showed a central building of colonial design with two small wings. Additional wings were built – a gymnasium and cafeteria wing on the north side in 1948 and a classroom wing on the south side in 1951."

The Cold War and WHS (1951–1966) 
During the suburban post-World War II population boom Wayland's population more than doubled (from 4,400 to 10,200 between 1950 and 1960). This new wave of residents included many well-educated individuals: doctors, lawyers, businessmen, who wanted an education for their children that was as professional as theirs. This, combined with overcrowding at the high school led to the formation of the School Building Committee.

Educational consultants Cambridge Consultants, Inc. of Boston were hired to help the town determine what educational changes and structural changes were needed to make the new high school better than the last. At the same time there was a nationwide push to focus on math and science education due the launch of Sputnik. In his 1957 annual report, superintendent Edward J. Anderson cited Sputnik as the reason why math and science needed more attention.

The groundbreaking ceremony for Wayland High School's new open campus was held on April 25, 1959. The campus was designed by Herbert Gallagher and John "Chip" Harkness of The Architects' Collaborative, who were hired by the Town of Wayland in January 1958; the two were assisted by the renowned architect Walter Gropius. "The initial design was to accommodate 850 students... Ultimately, the total cost of the buildings, ready for occupancy, was $2,356,748, close to the project’s estimates. Half of that amount was reimbursed by the state. Apparently, there was wide agreement in the community that this was a cost effective solution, as the bond issue to finance it was passed by a margin of 598 to 89 on its first submission in 1958...

In contrast to a conventional design, the Wayland plan called for five separate academic buildings and a field house. The buildings were arranged on a raised plaza connected by landscaped courtyards instead of traditional corridors... The conceptualization of the “campus” plan was to encourage independent study, creativity and a purposeful application of knowledge through a cross fertilization of subjects... By the time the plans were complete and funding was in place, there was a national recognition that something special was happening in the town of Wayland. In April of 1959, The New York Times took the unusual step of covering the groundbreaking ceremony in an article titled “High School Plan Has Campus Look.” The article describes the six buildings in detail and concludes that Wayland High School “will resemble a college campus in miniature.”

Later that same year the newspaper wrote about a Ford Foundation study that condemned most new school buildings as “educational straitjackets.” The Foundation concluded the then under construction Wayland High School was the antidote to this “egg-crate uniformity” because of its flexibility and how it encouraged small group seminars."  
When the high school opened in the fall of 1960, it was hailed for its innovative design. In November 1960 The Architectural Forum wrote, “Probably the most talked-about school plant in the U.S. this fall is a collection of five flat-roofed buildings and a big white dome set down in a green pasture some 16 miles west of Boston." The school received an enormous amount of attention from the press. Featured in Life magazine, Time magazine, The Architectural Forum, The New York Times, and The Boston Globe, it was identified as a leader of the advancement of education.

Expansion and renovation (1966–2000) 
In 1966, an English Building (later the Math-English Building) was built behind the Math-Science Building at the rear of the campus. This was followed six years later, in 1972, by the construction of an Administration/Media Center building in the front of the school, with renovations to areas in the Commons and Arts Buildings previously occupied by the administration and library spaces now relocated to the new building.

In 1968 Wayland became a METCO Community when, "nine students from Dorchester and Roxbury became our community’s ground-breakers, including eight freshmen and one sophomore, Elliott Francis, who would go on to become Wayland's first METCO graduate in 1971."

In November 1973 Aerosmith played one of their first concerts in Wayland's field house.

Between 1990 and 1992, Wayland Public Schools undertook renovations to all of its school buildings, including a $6.2 million renovation to Wayland High School. The scope of the project included replacing outdated building systems, updates to lighting, ceilings, flooring, and selected classroom modifications.

New building (2001–present) 
In late 2001, the Town of Wayland signed Dore & Whittier Architects to come up with concepts for a larger, modern high school. However, in 2003, The State of Massachusetts announced that it would put a moratorium on its state building assistance program. With state funding uncertain, the vote to proceed with the schematic designs for the Dore and Whittier proposals was defeated at a Town Meeting. In April 2003, and the firm withdrew from the project.

In 2009, Wayland voters approved a new, $70.8 million, three-building campus designed by HMFH Architects, Inc. Construction of the new school was completed at the end of November 2011, and occupancy by the student body began January 3, 2012. In February 2012, with the exception of the Field House, all of the original high school buildings were demolished.

Academics 

Students at Wayland High School are required to take courses in English, Social Studies, Mathematics, Science, Wellness, and Fine Arts in order to graduate. Courses are offered at the Advanced Placement, Honors, college, and Introductory level.

Beginning with the Class of 2022 Wayland will no longer provide weighted and unweighted GPAs. Principal Allyson Mizoguichi believes that this will benefit students, "We’re afraid students are making decisions on what they want to learn and explore about based on whether it will or won’t impact their weighted GPA... We want to remove that from the equation and more earnestly encourage students to take what they want to take.”

The vast majority of students pursue post-secondary education after leaving WHS. 92% of the class of 2022 planned on attending either a 4-year college, 2-year college, or prep school. In the past five years the top schools where students have matriculated include: Boston College, Boston University, Clark University, Harvard University, Northeastern University, Syracuse University, Tufts University, University of Massachusetts Amherst, University of Massachusetts Lowell, University of Michigan, University of New Hampshire, University of Vermont, University of Wisconsin, and Worcester Polytechnic Institute.

Awards and recognition 
Wayland High School is accredited by the New England Association of Schools and Colleges (NEASC).

In their 2021 rankings, U.S. News & World Report ranked WHS as #16 in Boston, MA Metro Area High Schools, #18 in Massachusetts High Schools, and #539 in National Rankings.

The faculty at Wayland High School has been nominated for, and won, numerous awards for their teaching. One of the most awarded teachers was former Social Studies and Business Department Head, Kevin Delaney. "Delaney is the recipient of the 2017 New England History Teachers Association Kidger Award for excellence in teaching, the 2016 Massachusetts Daughters of the American Revolution U.S. History Teacher of the Year, and the 2014 Massachusetts History Teacher of the Year." Delaney retired at the end of the 2020–2021 school year.

Numerous Wayland teachers have also won the Goldin Foundation Award for Excellence in Teaching including: Guidance Department Coordinator Marybeth Sacramone (2016), Former Business Teacher James Page (2011), Retired Drama Teacher Richard Weingartner (2005), Retired Social Studies Teacher Daniel Frio (1992), and Retired English Teacher Joseph Auciello (1991).

Fine and performing arts 
Wayland's fine and performing arts program is supported by the Creative Arts Parents Association (CAPA). Each year CAPA hosts a College A Cappella Night to help fundraise for Wayland's arts programs. Past performers include Boston University's Chordially Yours, the UMass Amherst Dynamics, Mount Holyoke College Diversions, and University of Oregon's On the Rocks.

Visual arts 
Wayland offers visual arts classes in drawing, painting, digital art, photography, ceramics, jewelry-making, and metalsmithing. Students are able to join the National Art Honors Society (NAHS) and each year numerous students are presented with gold keys, silver keys, and honorable mentions from the Scholastic Art and Writing Awards. In 2016, eleven WHS students won a record 42 Scholastic Art Awards.

Drama 
Wayland offers courses in acting, improvisation, dramatic arts, and communication studies. Each year the Wayland High School Theater Ensemble (WHSTE) produces three shows a year, including a musical, dramatic stage play/comedy, and a competition prepared for the Massachusetts Educational Theater Guild festival. In addition, one act festival plays for the event "Winter Week" are typically written, acted and directed by students.

Music 
Wayland High School has numerous music performance groups include a String Orchestra, Honors Sinfonia Orchestra, Honors Orchestra, Chorale, Honors Concert Choir, Concert Band, Honors Wind Ensemble, Jazz Band, Honors Jazz Ensemble, and A Capella Groups. The school also offers general music classes in The History of Jazz, Rock, and Rap, Music Theory, Piano, Guitar, and Music Production. WHS also has three, student-run a cappella groups: the coed Madrigals, the all-male Testostertones or "T-Tones", and the all-female Muses.

Dance 
Window Dance Ensemble is Wayland's student dance performance group. Each spring students choreograph and perform dances designed to showcase skills in various styles of dance including jazz, hip-hop, ballet, and tap.

Athletics 
Wayland is a member of the Dual County League (DCL) which is part of the Massachusetts Interscholastic Athletic Association (MIAA) and offers a number of athletic opportunities for students. In addition, Wayland also collaborates with athletic rival Weston High School to provide two additional athletic opportunities. The Wayland/Weston Girls Hockey team and the Wayland-Weston crew team.

Crew 
The Wayland-Weston Crew team is one of the best high school crew teams in the nation and has sent boats to compete at the U.S. Rowing Association Youth National Championships every year since 2006. The crew team also regularly competes in regattas such as the Head of the Charles, Head of the Schuylkill, and Textile River Regatta.

Football 
In 2006 Wayland's Varsity football team was undefeated and won the Division 1A State Championship ("The Super Bowl") beating Marshfield High School, 28–0. It was the first time in 31 years that Wayland had been to the playoffs and the first Super Bowl win for Wayland. The football team traditionally plays against rival Weston High School on Thanksgiving Day.

Wrestling 
In 2006 coach Gary Chase led the Varsity wrestling team to an "undisputed championship" winning both the individual and dual meet state championships. After that season his son, Sean Chase, became the head wrestling coach. In 2016 the Wrestling Team won both the DCL championship and the Division 3 state championship. In 2019 the Wrestling team lost the DCL championship 36–40 to Westford Academy. In 2020 the Warriors beat Boston Latin to clinch the DCL title and were hoping to win a state championship, however the season was cancelled due to the COVID-19 pandemic.

Soccer 
In 2014 the Varsity Boys Soccer team won the state championship for the first time in 13 years. Then "[i]n both 2016 and 2018, the boys team faced the same opponent in both state championships: Nipmunc Regional High School" winning both championships.

In 2017 the "Wayland girls’ soccer team pulled off a major upset to land their spot in the Semifinals after beating top-seeded Saugus as the 16th seed on November 3" eventually losing to Newburyport in D3 North Semifinals in penalty kicks.

Lacrosse 
Both the Boys and Girls Lacrosse teams made the Division II playoffs in 2018 and both were ranked as the number one seed in their respective tournaments. The Girls team won their Division, beating number two seed Groton-Dunstable 17–8, but fell to Bromfield in the state semi-final 13–10. The Boys team beat rival Lincoln-Sudbury for the first time since 1999 to earn their spot in the playoffs, but ultimately lost during the second round to Concord-Carlise.

Swim and dive 
In 2009 both the boys and the girls Swim and Dive Teams won Division II State titles becoming the first school in Massachusetts history to win championships in the same year. In 2010 and 2019 both teams were state champions again. The boys team has gone on to win subsequent state titles in 2017, 2018, 2019, and 2020. The Girls have won 10 state championships overall in 1973, 2006–2010, 2012–2014, and 2019.

Tennis 
The Wayland Boys tennis team is a "perennial power" and won the state championship in 2012, 2014, 2015, and 2017. In 2016 the Wayland Wayland Girls tennis team advanced to the MIAA state finals, and in 2017 they won the state championship.

Mascot 
Wayland's mascot is the Warriors. At the end of the 2017 school year, after years of controversy around the logo, the Athletic Advisory Committee voted removed the Native American imagery from the Warriors logo.

Extracurriculars
Wayland High School offers a number of student-led clubs including: Audio-Visual Club, Amnesty International, Anime Club, Art Club, Asian Club, Awareness and Action Against Cancer, Book Club, Climate Committee, Coding Club, Community Service Club, Debate Team, ESports, FBLA (Future Business Leaders of America), Fencing Club, Fishing Club, Foreign Film Club, Green Team, Interact Club, Math Team, Mock Trial, Model UN, Move, National Art Honor Society, National Honor Society (NHS), Outdoorsman Club, Paws Club, Philanthropy Club, Philosophy Club, Photography Club, Rubik's Cube Club, Russian Club, Science Olympiad, Sneaker Club, Sports Management, Tear it UP, TedX 2020, Tri-M Music Honor Society, Ultimate Frisbee, Water Warriors, Women in STEM, Women's Empowerment Club, World Language Club, and Yearbook Club.

Wayland Student Press Network (WSPN) 
The Wayland Student Press Network (WSPN) was founded in 2007 and subsequently led to the creation of a journalism class at Wayland High School. WSPN's reporting has won them numerous awards including National Scholastic Press Association "Pacemaker" awards which honors, "the very best scholastic broadcasts, literary arts magazines, newspapers/newsmagazines, online publications, specialty magazines and yearbooks" in 2008–2011, 2013, 2014, 2018, 2020, and 2021. WSPN has also been a Columbia Scholastic Press Association Gold Crown Award winner in 2009-2013 and 2021.

Robotics 
In 2014 a group of students founded a FIRST Robotics Competition team called the "Control Freaks 5735". In 2017 the team won the "Excellence in Engineering Award" at the North Shore Reading Event and in 2019 the team won their first district competition and the Pit Safety Award at the North Shore District Event.

Students Against Destructive Decisions (SADD) 
In 1981 Robert Anastas, a former Wayland High School counselor and hockey coach, founded Students Against Drunk Driving (SADD), now known as Students Against Destructive Decisions, at Wayland High School. Anastas founded the organization with his students after two boys he coached were killed in car accidents where they had been drinking.

Notable alumni 
Samuel Adams Wisner, class of 2006, rapper
Erika Uyterhoeven, class of 2004, politician
Taylor Schilling, class of 2002, actress (TV series Orange Is the New Black)
Daniel Lopatin, class of 2000, musician (Oneohtrix Point Never)
Ryan Sypek, class of 2000, actor (TV series Wildfire)
Amber Gray, class of 1999, actress and musician best known for portraying Hélène Kuragina in the 2016 Broadway musical Natasha, Pierre, & the Great Comet of 1812.
Sarah Hurwitz, class of 1995, speechwriter to Hillary Clinton and Barack Obama.
Gregg Kavet, writer and co-executive producer, Seinfeld
Alberto Salazar, class of 1976, winner of the Boston Marathon and three-time winner of the New York City Marathon, coach until he was banned for life
Douglas Jabs, class of 1969, expert in clinical research in the fields of ophthalmology and uveitis
Charles ‘Buzz’ Bowers (1929–2015), Minor League Baseball player and baseball talent scout.

References

External links

Wayland High School

Walter Gropius buildings
Educational institutions established in 1960
Schools in Middlesex County, Massachusetts
Public high schools in Massachusetts
1960 establishments in Massachusetts